Provincial road N401 is a Dutch provincial road.

See also

References

External links

401
401